Afro-Ukrainians or Black Ukrainians (Dark-skinned), are Ukrainians of Sub-Saharan African descent, including Black people who have settled in Ukraine. Black Ukrainians are multi-lingual, knowing both Russian and Ukrainian in addition to their native languages, and are aware of the cultural conflict in Ukraine between the Ukrainian and Russian languages. The population of Afro-Ukrainians is rather small and is mostly concentrated in the major cities of Ukraine.

Nehr
While in modern French, nègre is considered offensive, same as nehr/неɾр in Ukrainian language (as negro is in Spanish and Portuguese). The native Slavic words for things that are actually black (e.g. a car with black paint) are chórnyy.
 Aderinsola Habib Eseola, Nigerian-Ukrainian football player
 Aleks Chidomere, Nigerian-Ukrainian football player
 Antoniy Emere, Nigerian-Ukrainian football player
 Berta Vázquez, Ukrainian-born Spanish actress of Ethiopian-Ukrainian descent
 Colince Ngaha Poungoue, Cameroon-born football player and manager
 Daniel Ehbudzhuo, Nigerian-Ukrainian football player
 Denys Ndukve, Nigerian-Ukrainian football player
 Gaitana, Congolese-Ukrainian singer
 Ismail Sillakh, Sierra Leonean-Ukrainian boxer 
 Issuf Sanon, Burkinabé-Ukrainian basketball player
 Joel Bolomboy, Ukrainian-born Congolese-Russian basketball player
 Mark Mampassi, Congolese-Ukrainian football player
 Olavale Fabunmi, Nigerian-Ukrainian football player
 Philippe Hamilton-Rollings, Ghanaian-Ukrainian football player
 Quedjau Nhabali, Bissau-Guinean-Ukrainian judoka
 Roland Bilala, Congolese-Ukrainian football player
 Şeref Osmanoğlu, Ukrainian-born Turkish athlete of Sudanese-Ukrainian descent
 Vladis-Emmerson Illoy-Ayyet, Congolese-Ukrainian football player
 Zhan Beleniuk, Rwandan-Ukrainian wrestler and politician

References

External links
 Chornobrivci website 
 How do in general Afro-Ukrainians live?, a blog of the Ukrainian born Mozambique national Dmytro Yatsiuk
 Orange Mozambique. Vakhtang Kipiani website.
 Huzio, H. Gaitana: Women should be first to give freedom to feelings. Interview to "Vysokyi Zamok". Art Vertep.

African diaspora in Europe
Ukrainian
Ethnic groups in Ukraine